The  is an electric multiple unit (EMU) train operated by Central Japan Railway Company (JR Central) in Japan between 1991 and 2014. Originally used on Asagiri limited express services in conjunction with Odakyu Electric Railway, from 2012 until its withdrawal in 2014, the train was used on Gotemba Line excursion services. It was subsequently sold to the private railway operator Fuji Kyuko and rebuilt as the Fujikyu 8500 series for use on Fujisan Tokkyu services from March 2016.

Design
The lone 7-car 371 series set was built jointly by Hitachi, Kawasaki Heavy Industries, and Nippon Sharyo.

Operations

In addition to the daytime Asagiri services, the train was also used on the following "Home Liner" limited-stop commuter services.
 Home Liner Numazu
 Home Liner Hamamatsu
 Home Liner Shizuoka

From 17 March, the 371 series and 20000 series trains were replaced by Odakyu 60000 series MSE EMUs on Asagiri" services.

From June 2012, the 371 series set was used on additional limited-stop "Rapid" services on the Gotemba Line connected with a series of hiking events.

Formation
The one 7-car set, X1, was formed as follows. The two Green (first class) cars, 3 and 4, were bilevel cars.

Cars 1, 5, and 7 are each fitted with one C-PS27A single-arm pantograph.

Interior
Standard class cars had regular 2+2 seating. The two bilevel cars had Green (first class) accommodation on the upper decks with 2+1 seating, and standard-class accommodation on the lower decks, also with 2+1 seating.

History

The 371 series set entered service on 16 March 1991. From 24 June 1997, car 7 was made no-smoking, and from 18 March 2007, all cars were made no-smoking. From 6 November 2006, the original PS24A lozenge-type pantographs were replaced with C-PS27A single-arm pantographs.

Withdrawal
The 371 series was withdrawn from Asagiri services following its last run on 16 March 2012. It was subsequently re-employed as a special charter train for use from autumn 2012.

The train was finally withdrawn from service after a final run on 30 November 2014.

Resale

In December 2014, it was announced that the private railway operator Fuji Kyuko planned to purchase the trainset, and reform it as a three-car set for use on Fujisan Tokkyu'' services later in fiscal 2015. The train was moved from Shizuoka to JR East's Nagano Works for rebuilding work in March 2015.

References

External links

 JR Central 371 series information 

Electric multiple units of Japan
Central Japan Railway Company
Train-related introductions in 1991
Hitachi multiple units
Kawasaki multiple units
Nippon Sharyo multiple units
1500 V DC multiple units of Japan